Bloody Pit of Horror is the twelfth studio album by Gwar. It was released on November 9, 2010, on Metal Blade Records.

The first track, "Zombies, March!" is now available for streaming at Bloody-Disgusting's website.

This is the last album to feature longtime character Flattus Maximus before Cory Smoot's death and Flattus' retirement.
This album does not have a coinciding movie.

Track listing

Line-up 
 Dave Brockie (Oderus Urungus) - lead vocals
 Cory Smoot (Flattus Maximus) - lead guitar, backing vocals
 Mike Derks (Balsac the Jaws of Death) - rhythm guitar, backing vocals
 Casey Orr (Beefcake the Mighty) - bass, backing vocals, lead vocals on "Beat You to Death"
 Brad Roberts (Jizmak Da Gusha) - drums

References 

2010 albums
Gwar albums
Metal Blade Records albums